This is a list of the National Register of Historic Places listings in Fayette County, Texas.

This is intended to be a complete list of properties and districts listed on the National Register of Historic Places in Fayette County, Texas. There are four districts and 19 individual properties listed on the National Register in the county. The individually listed properties include one State Historic Site, five State Antiquities Landmarks, and seven Recorded Texas Historic Landmarks. Three districts together include numerous additional Recorded Texas Historic Landmarks. Three properties were formerly listed on the National Register including one that has since been relisted after relocation.

Current listings

The locations of National Register properties and districts may be seen in a mapping service provided.

|}

Former listings

|}

See also

National Register of Historic Places listings in Texas
List of Texas State Historic Sites
Recorded Texas Historic Landmarks in Fayette County

References

External links

Registered Historic Places
Fayette County